Melanie Johnson-DeBaufre is the Associate Dean of the Theology School at Drew University. She is known for her research into early Christianity, its relationship to the Roman Empire, and modern feminist interpretation.

Education and Career 
In 1988, Melanie Johnson-DeBaufre earned her Bachelor of Arts degree from Eastern College. She then went on to receive her Master of Divinity (M.Div) in 1992 and her Doctor of Theology (Th.D) in 2002 from Harvard Divinity School. Johnson-DeBaufre worked as an Assistant Professor of the Department of Religion and Philosophy at Luther College from 2000 to 2004. Starting in 2005, she continued her career as an Associate Dean of Academic Affairs and Assistant Professor of New Testament and Early Christianity at the Drew Theological School and the Graduate Division of Religion.

Research and Major publications 
The major works of Johnson-DeBaufre are primarily feminist interpretation and analysis of the earliest Christianities. Her feminist approach to religious historiography has allowed her to explore ancient texts and cultures from previously unknown angles.

Walk in the Ways of Wisdom: Essays in Honor of Elisabeth Schüssler Fiorenza 
Johnson-DeBaufre co-edited this compilation of essays focusing on feminist theological research and interpretation. Written to honor Fiorenza's sixty-fifth birthday, the book is composed of essays written by students who studied under her and that focus on topics connected to Fiorenza's own research.

Jesus Among Her Children: Q, Eschatology, and the Construction of Christian Origins 
In this major work, published by Harvard University Press,  she analyzes theologians’ current knowledge of Q and its impact on modern theology. Furthermore, she questions whether Jesus is an apocalyptic prophet or a wisdom sage in the original work, and frequently connects her questions to the feminine concept of wisdom.

Mary Magdalene Understood 
This novel is Johnson-DeBaufre's layman's translation of Jane Schaberg's The Resurrection of Mary Magdalene. Johnson-DeBaufre provides Shaberg's original ideas, condenses and simplifies her research and interpretation of Mary Magdalene, while also inserting her own insights about the figure of Mary Magdalene. Multiple sources on Mary Magdalene are explored including the ancient texts, both canon and apocryphal, and several popular culture renditions such as The Da Vinci Code and Franco Zeffirelli's Jesus of Nazareth.

Further reading 
 M. Johnson-DeBaufre, "Beyond the Heroic Paul: Toward a Feminist and Decolonizing Approach to the Letters of Paul," in Paul and Postcolonialism, ed. Christopher Stanley. Minneapolis, MN: Fortress Press, forthcoming). 
 M. Johnson-DeBaufre, "'That One' Takes a Village: The Uniqueness of Jesus and the Beelzebul Controversy (Q 11:14-26)," The Fourth R (2009): 3–7, 10, 22.
 M. Johnson-DeBaufre, "'Gazing Upon the Invisible': Archaeology, Historiography, and the Elusive Women of 1 Thessalonians," in From Roman to Early Christian Thessalonike: Studies in Religion and Archaeology. Laura Nasrallah and Steven Friesen, eds. Cambridge: Harvard University Press, 2010. 
 M. Johnson-DeBaufre, "Mapping the Field, Shaping the Discipline: Graduate Biblical Education as Rhetorical Formation," in Transforming Graduate Biblical Education: Ethos and Discipline. Elisabeth Schüssler Fiorenza and Kent Richards, eds. Atlanta, GA: SBL Press, 2010.
 M. Johnson-DeBaufre, "Communities Resisting Fragmentation: Q and the Work of James C. Scott," in Richard A. Horsley, editor, Oral Performance, Popular Tradition, and Hidden Transcript in Q. Atlanta: Society of Biblical Literature, 2006.
 M. Johnson-DeBaufre, "The Blood Required of This Generation: Interpreting Communal Blame in a Colonial Context" in Shelly Matthews and E. Leigh Gibson, eds., Violence in the New Testament (2005), 22–34.
 M. Johnson-DeBaufre, "There's Something About Mary Magdalene" by Jane Schaberg and Melanie Johnson-DeBaufre –article in Ms. Magazine, Spring 2006. p. 51-52.
 M. Johnson-DeBaufre, "Bridging the Gap to 'This Generation': A Feminist-Critical Reading of Q 7:31-35," in Walk in the Ways of Wisdom: Essays in Honor of Elisabeth Schüssler Fiorenza, Melanie Johnson-DeBaufre, Cynthia Kittredge, and Shelly Matthews, eds. (Harrisburg, PA : Trinity Press, 2003).

References 

Harvard Divinity School alumni
Living people
Year of birth missing (living people)
Members of the Jesus Seminar
Drew University faculty
Eastern University (United States) alumni